Rainbow Mountain is a stratovolcano at the southern end of the Cascade Range in Siskiyou County, California. It is located between Mount Shasta and the Medicine Lake Volcano, consisting of andesitic and dacitic rocks that were produced during the Early Pleistocene subepoch. Its last known eruption is also of Pleistocene age.

See also
List of Cascade volcanoes

References

External links

Cascade Range
Volcanoes of Siskiyou County, California
Subduction volcanoes
Cascade Volcanoes
Pleistocene stratovolcanoes
Stratovolcanoes of the United States